Bobbie Gentry (born Roberta Lee Streeter; July 27, 1942) is a retired American singer-songwriter, who was one of the first female artists in America to compose and produce her own material.

Gentry rose to international fame in 1967 with her Southern Gothic narrative "Ode to Billie Joe". The track spent four weeks at No. 1 on the Billboard Hot 100 chart and was third in the Billboard year-end chart of 1967, earning Gentry Grammy awards for Best New Artist and Best Female Pop Vocal Performance in 1968.

Gentry charted 11 singles on the Billboard Hot 100 and four singles on the United Kingdom Top 40. Her album Fancy brought her a Grammy nomination for Best Female Pop Vocal Performance. After her first albums, she had a successful run of variety shows on the Las Vegas Strip. In the late 1970s Gentry lost interest in performing, and subsequently retired from the music industry. News reports conflict on the subject of where she lives.

Early life 
Gentry was born Roberta Lee Streeter on July 27, 1942, near Woodland in Chickasaw County, Mississippi, to Ruby Lee (née Shipman; November 28, 1920 – April 2, 1989) and Robert Harrison Streeter. After her parents divorced shortly after her birth, her mother moved to California, leaving Gentry to be raised on a farm by her paternal grandparents. She grew up without electricity or plumbing. Her grandmother traded one of the family's milk cows for a neighbor's piano, and, at age seven, Gentry composed her first song, "My Dog Sergeant Is a Good Dog." Gentry lived in Greenwood, Mississippi, with her father for a few years and learned to play the guitar and banjo.

At age 13, Gentry moved to Palm Springs, California, to live with her then-remarried mother. They performed as a duo, Ruby and Bobbie Meyers, for a short time. Gentry took her stage name from the 1952 film Ruby Gentry, which she had seen on television. In the film, Ruby (played by Jennifer Jones) was a poor but beautiful girl from the backwoods, who ended up marrying the town tycoon.

After graduating high school, Gentry moved to Los Angeles to enter UCLA as a philosophy major. She supported herself with clerical jobs, occasionally performing at nightclubs and country clubs, and when she appeared in a revue at Les Folies Bergeres nightclub in Las Vegas, Bob Hope encouraged her to keep performing. She worked as a fashion model, and on June 29, 1962, United Press International circulated a wire photo of Gentry that included Cheryl Crane, daughter of Lana Turner. Gentry transferred to the Los Angeles Conservatory of Music, where she took classes in composition, music theory and arranging. While attending a Jody Reynolds concert at a club in Palm Springs in 1966, Gentry asked if she could sit in on one of Reynolds' recording sessions. This led to an invitation to sing on two duets with Reynolds: "Stranger in the Mirror" and "Requiem for Love". The two songs were released in September 1966 by Titan Records, but failed to chart.

Career

1967: Debut
Gentry recorded a demo at Whitney Recording Studio in Glendale, California, in February and March 1967. Her sole ambition originally was to write songs to sell to other artists, telling The Washington Post that she only sang on the recording of "Ode to Billie Joe" that she took to Capitol because it was cheaper than hiring someone to sing it.

Gentry signed with Capitol Records on June 23, 1967, where staff producer Kelly Gordon would produce Ode to Billie Joe as his first full-length album for the label. But it was "Mississippi Delta," intended as the A-side of her first single, that initially got Gentry signed. Her original demo of "Mississippi Delta" was the version issued, but "Ode to Billie Joe" acquired a string arrangement by Jimmie Haskell, dubbed onto the original recording at Capitol. The day after the string session, Capitol's A&R team decided to make "Ode to Billie Joe" the A-side. The single was released on July 10, 1967. It would spend four weeks at number one on the Billboard Hot 100 and, on the year-end chart, place number three. The single reached number eight on the Billboard Black Singles chart and number 13 on the UK Top 40. It sold more than 3,000,000 copies worldwide. In 2001, Rolling Stone magazine listed "Ode to Billie Joe" among the 500 Greatest Songs of All Time.

Following the single's success, the producers quickly assembled the rest of the album from the 12 demos Gentry had recorded, completing overdubs in a matter of days. The result was a unique combination of blues, folk, and jazz elements that rounded out Gentry's recollections of her home, coming across more as a concept album than a hastily assembled collection of songs. Capitol pre-ordered 500,000 copies—the largest pressing of a debut album in the label's prior history. The album hit stores within a month of pressing, on August 21. Ode to Billie Joe replaced the Beatles' Sgt. Pepper's Lonely Hearts Club Band at the top of the Billboard 200 and reached No. 5 on the Billboard Black Albums chart. Gentry won three Grammy Awards in 1967, including Best New Artist and Best Female Pop Vocal Performance. She was also named the Academy of Country Music's Most Promising Female Vocalist.

1968: The Delta Sweete, Local Gentry and Glen Campbell
In February 1968, Gentry took part in the Italian Song Festival in Sanremo competition, as one of two performers of "La Siepe" by Vito Pallavicini and Massara. Capitol released the song concurrently as a single, backed by another Italian tune also recorded by Gentry, "La Città è Grande" by Pallavicini and De Ponti.

Gentry's second album, The Delta Sweete, was released in February 1968. In its musical ambition, the album represented a decisive step beyond her debut. This concept album drew inspiration from Gentry's Mississippi Delta roots. Most of its sound comes from Gentry, who played almost every instrument on its tracks, including piano, guitar, banjo, bass, and vibes. Nonetheless, Capitol's Kelly Gordon, producer of Gentry's first work for the label, also received the entire producing credit for The Delta Sweete. The album earned Gentry two more entries on the Billboard Hot 100. "Okolona River Bottom Band" peaked at number 54, while her cover of "Louisiana Man" made it to number 100. Although the album failed to match the success of its predecessor, only reaching number 132 on the Billboard 200, critics have called it one of the unacclaimed masterpieces of the 1960s.

Impressed with Gentry's performances on- and off-screen, the head of the BBC invited her, in 1968, to host a variety show on BBC 2, making her the first female songwriter to host a series on the network. With help from producer Stanley Dorfman, she made six half-hour episodes that aired weekly from July 13 to August 17 of that year. Dorfman told author Tara Murtha, "After a few episodes, she was pretty much co-directing the show because she had such great ideas. [But] the BBC wouldn't have it, wouldn't have an artist credited as a director or producer, so the credit went to me as producer and director. But she definitely contributed as much as I did creatively to the show. She was just full of ideas."

Following The Delta Sweete, Capitol released Gentry's third album, Local Gentry, in August 1968. It failed to appear on any of the Billboard album charts, but did peak at number 83 on the Cashbox Top 100 Albums chart.

In September, one month after the release of Local Gentry,the artist's third album of 1968 came out. Bobbie Gentry and Glen Campbell features duets with label mate Glen Campbell. Their chemistry made the partnership a great success. The album peaked at number 11 on the Billboard Top LP's chart and number one on the Top Country LP's chart. It was also certified Gold by the RIAA and earned Gentry and Campbell the Academy of Country Music award for Album of the Year. Gentry was also nominated for Top Female Vocalist.

1969: Touch 'Em with Love
Gentry produced a second series of shows for BBC2 in 1969, which aired weekly from June 18 to July 23.

Gentry's fifth album, Touch 'Em with Love, came out in July 1969. It marked a transition in her career: In an attempt to re-brand Gentry as a blue-eyed soul singer, it featured fewer self-penned regional songs and more systematically chosen cover songs. Recorded in Nashville and produced by Kelso Herston, the album's 10 tracks included only two originals. The title track was released as the first single, but it failed to go above number 113 on Billboard'''s Bubbling Under the Hot 100 chart and only reached number 164 on the Billboard 200. Gentry's cover of "I'll Never Fall in Love Again" was released as the second single in the UK, where it became a number one hit on the UK Singles Chart. The album reached number 21 on the UK Albums Chart.

In 1969, Gentry taped four television specials for Canadian television station CFTO-TV Toronto for North American syndication.

1970: Fancy
April 1970 saw the release of Fancy, Gentry's sixth album in three years. Like 1969's Touch 'Em with Love, it contains only covers, except for the artist's self-penned title track. Most of the album was recorded at Fame Recording Studios in Muscle Shoals, Alabama, with producer Rick Hall. "Fancy," released as the album's first single, became Gentry's biggest hit since "Ode to Billie Joe", peaking within the top 40 in the US, Canada, and Australia. Of the song Gentry herself said, "Fancy is my strongest statement for women's lib, if you really listen to it. I agree wholeheartedly with that movement and all the serious issues that [it stands] for—equality, equal pay, day care centers, and abortion rights," she explained to After Dark magazine in 1974.

The album's first European single, a cover of "Raindrops Keep Falling on My Head", peaked at number 40. The album's second North American single, "He Made a Woman Out of Me", did not reach the same heights as "Fancy", reaching only number 71 on the Billboard Hot 100.

Gentry would be nominated for Best Contemporary Vocal Performance, Female at the 13th Annual Grammy Awards.

1971–1974: Patchwork and departure from Capitol
In early 1971, Gentry produced a third and final series of shows for BBC 2, also consisting of six weekly episodes (aired from February 1 to March 15 of that year).

Gentry released Patchwork in April 1971. It has been described as a collection of short stories in song, ranging from country and pop to blues, stitched together with cinematic interludes to form a cohesive whole. Patchwork was Gentry's first entirely self-written and -produced album. Its first single: "But I Can't Get Back", was a small hit, peaking at number 37 on the Billboard Top 40 Easy Listening chart and number 93 in Canada. Gentry would release one more single for Capitol in August 1972, "The Girl from Cincinnati".

Around the time Patchwork was released, the entire executive board that had been at Capitol throughout Gentry's career was fired. A major restructuring at Capitol took place as parent company EMI tried to seize back control and rekindle the label's dwindling profits. This saw the artist roster slashed from 247 to 81 alongside extensive cuts to production and marketing budgets. With none of the executive board left that had known and worked with her, negotiations stalled over the renewal terms of Gentry's contract, and this failure to reach an agreement with Capitol created a stalemate. Since Gentry was unwilling to release an album with Capitol on the terms offered, she found herself unable to release an album on another label, meaning she was left with no choice but to wait out the remaining option period of her contract.

In 1974, she hosted a summer replacement variety show on CBS called The Bobbie Gentry Happiness Hour. The show, which was her version of Glen Campbell's hit series The Glen Campbell Goodtime Hour, was not renewed for a full season.

1975–1977: Post-Capitol recordings
In 1975, Gentry wrote and performed "Another Place, Another Time" for writer-director Max Baer, Jr.'s film Macon County Line. Following the film's success the song was released on a promotional 7-inch single. In 1976, Baer directed the feature film Ode to Billy Joe, based on Gentry's hit song and starring Robby Benson and Glynnis O'Connor. In the movie, the mystery of the title character's suicide is revealed as a part of the conflict between his love for Bobbie Lee Hartley and a drunken homosexual experience. Warner Bros. Records released a soundtrack of the score by Michel Legrand, including a re-recorded version of "Ode to Billie Joe", re-titled "Ode to Billy Joe" to match the film's title, with Gentry stating that the original spelling was an error. Warner Bros. released the new version as a single and Capitol re-released the original version, which gave Gentry two concurrent chart placings with the same song. The re-recording would go on to be Gentry's last single to chart, meaning that her first and last chart entries are the same song.

In 1977 Gentry reunited with producer Rick Hall in Muscle Shoals to record an album for the Curb Records division of Warner Bros. Records (unlike Gentry's 1969 Fancy album, Gentry's 1977 recording sessions with Hall were not at his FAME Studios but at the nearby Music Mill Studio). After an advance single: "Steal Away", had an unsuccessful February 1978 release, the album was shelved. "Steal Away" - a remake of the 1964 Jimmy Hughes hit which had inaugurated FAME Studios hit streak - had as its B-side: the Patti Dahlstrom composition "He Did Me Wrong, But He Did It Right": these tracks plus three additional tracks from Gentry's 1977 recording sessions: "Slow Cookin'" (written by Abby Marable), "Sweet Country" (written by Gentry), and "Thunder in the Afternoon" (written by Mac Davis, Rita Grimm and Yvonne Norman), would be released on the 1992 European compilation album Ode to Billie Joe.

1978–1982: Final  projects before retirement
Gentry appeared as a guest on The Tonight Show Starring Johnny Carson on Christmas Day 1978. She attended the Best of Vegas Awards on March 21, 1980.

On May 10, 1981, Gentry was one of many celebrity guests to take part in An All-Star Salute to Mother's Day. During the television special she performed "Mama, a Rainbow" from the musical Minnie's Boys for her mother who was seated in the audience. This would prove to be Gentry's final public performance.

The last time Gentry appeared in public was when she attended the Academy of Country Music Awards on April 30, 1982. She was 39 years old. Since that time, she has not recorded, performed or been interviewed. One 2016 news report stated that Gentry lives in a gated community near Memphis, Tennessee.  According to another, Gentry lives in a gated community in Los Angeles.

Awards and nominations

 Personal life 
Gentry married casino magnate Bill Harrah on December 18, 1969, when he was 58 years old and she was 27. The couple divorced April 16, 1970. She married Thomas R. Toutant on August 17, 1976, whom she divorced on August 1, 1978. On October 15, 1978, Gentry married singer and comedian Jim Stafford with whom she had a son, Tyler Gentry Stafford. Gentry and Stafford divorced in September 1980.Magazine in late 1978 in Las Vegas

Gentry also had partial ownership of the Phoenix Suns NBA team from the team's inception in 1968 until 1987.

 Legacy 
Gentry charted 11 singles on the Billboard Hot 100 and four singles in the Top 40 of the UK Singles Chart.

Beth Orton recorded a song titled "Bobby Gentry" featured on her The Other Side of Daybreak album. Jill Sobule recorded "Where Is Bobbie Gentry?" for her album California Years.  Gentry's 1969 composition "Fancy" provided a top 10 country hit for Reba McEntire in 1991.

In 2011, producer and singer Joe Henry said Gentry's writing influenced him early in his life.

On May 14, 2012, BBC Radio 2 in the UK broadcast a documentary titled Whatever Happened to Bobbie Gentry? presented by country music artist Rosanne Cash.

In September 2018, an eight-disc box set titled The Girl from Chickasaw County: The Complete Capitol Masters featuring all of Gentry's recordings for Capitol was released.

In February 2019, Mercury Rev released Bobbie Gentry's the Delta Sweete Revisited, which was called a "reimagining of Bobbie Gentry's forgotten masterpiece".

In 2020, she was inducted into the Nashville Songwriters Hall of Fame.

 Discography Ode to Billie Joe (1967)The Delta Sweete (1968)Local Gentry (1968)Bobbie Gentry and Glen Campbell  (1968)Touch 'Em with Love (1969)Fancy (1970)Patchwork'' (1971)

Filmography

Television

References

External links 
 The Bobbie Gentry Website An official site backed by Universal Music Group (which  owns Capitol Records)
 
 Bobbie Gentry: Exit Stage Left podcast
 Whatever Happened to Bobbie Gentry? BBC Radio site for a May 14, 2012 programme that discussed her career with interviews of people who worked with her. The Telegraph newspaper radio show preview article

1942 births
20th-century American composers
20th-century American women guitarists
20th-century American women singers
20th-century American singers
20th-century women composers
21st-century American composers
21st-century American women guitarists
21st-century American women singers
21st-century American singers
21st-century women composers
American acoustic guitarists
American country guitarists
American country singer-songwriters
American women composers
American women country singers
Country musicians from Mississippi
Grammy Award winners
Guitarists from Mississippi
Living people
People from Chickasaw County, Mississippi
Phoenix Suns owners
Singer-songwriters from Mississippi
University of California, Los Angeles alumni